Neugrund is a meteorite crater in Estonia. The crater is at the bottom of the sea and is not exposed at the surface. Boulders of gneissic breccia found on the coast of Osmussaar, a nearby island, are believed to have been thrown there by the explosion.
It has been proposed that the Neugrund crater was created during the Ordovician meteor event when a hypothetical large asteroid transferred directly into a resonant orbit with Jupiter, which shifted its orbit to intercept Earth.

This attractive theory may need to be changed as more recent study puts the age of the impact in the Cambrian.

See also 
 Ordovician meteor event
 Kärdla crater
 Neugrund breccia

References 

Impact craters of Estonia
Cambrian impact craters
Landforms of Lääne County